Pyry may refer to:

 Pyry (given name), a Finnish given name
 Pyry (neighborhood), a neighborhood in Warsaw
 VL Pyry, Finnish fighter trainer aircraft